Monolit was a metal band from Mostar, Bosnia and Herzegovina, formed in 1988. It was founded by the late Zlatko Mehić, Marin Bago, Predrag Glogovac and Slobodan Ernjakovic.

Biography 

Same year, they recorded the first three-song demo that got a good reception amongst both fans and critics. In 1990, they recorded the second three-song demo, although it was a slight departure from earlier works that were characterized by more heavier direction. New sound was welcomed throughout Yugoslavia in all the important music magazines  In addition, the band expanded their fan base, which culminated with few big live shows around the country.

In 1991 they had their first album's worth of material recorded, and they played in the Sarajevo at the biggest metal festival in former Yugoslavia, in front of 2,500 fans.  In 1992 civil war was spreading across the country and band is broke up. Upon their first meeting since the civil war in 2006, two band members paid a tribute to a lost friend. They re-recorded "Kletva", in a memory of the band's drummer and the founding member, Zlatko Mehic (Zuba), who had died in the war in 1993.
 
The decision was made for the band to continue on, even though Predrag is in Norway, and Slobodan in Canada. Monolit released its first album, Arcana Balkanica, in 2008, a collection of old and new songs on One Records from Belgrade. In 2011 Mighty Records from Germany contacted the band about officially releasing old songs. This record was released under the name Deimos Tapes. Mascot of the band was Joker with name Deimos, that's why name Deimos Tapes. Although not new material, this is rather songs recorded in period from 88 to 92 re-mastered with 2 newly recorded songs as bonus.

Band members 

Current
 Slobodan Ernjaković – lead vocals, guitar (1988–1992 / 2006-2008)
 Predrag Glogovac – guitar (1988–1992 / (2006-2008)

Former
Zlatko Mehić (deceased) – drums (1986–1992)
Marin Bago – Bass   (1986–1992)
Miljan Bjelica - Guitar(1986-1987)
Emil Glavas - Vocalist (1986-1987)
Svjetlan Skakic - Guitar (1987-1988)
Dražan Nastić – Vocals (1991)
Saša Kapor – Guitar(1991)

Discography

Albums 
Arcana Balkanica (2008)
Deimos Tapes (2012)

Demos
Demo (3 tracks)  (1988)
Demo (3 tracks)  (1990)

References

External links
 MySpace.com
 Bosnian-metal.blogspot.com
 Metal-archives.com

Bosnia and Herzegovina heavy metal musical groups
Thrash metal musical groups
Musical groups established in 1988
Musical quartets
Yugoslav heavy metal musical groups